Elna, ELNA o Elne may refer to:

Geography 
Elna, California, a ghost town in California, US
Elna, Kentucky, an unincorporated community in Johnson County, Kentucky, US
Elne, a town in the Pyrénées-Orientales department in southern France

Industry 
Elna (Swiss company), a Swiss manufacturer of sewing machines
Elna (Japanese company), a Japanese electronics company

Other 
Elna (name), a female name
Esperanto-USA, formally Esperanto League of North America
Exercito de Libertafao Nacional de Angola, armed wing of the National Liberation Front of Angola